Kay Barsdell (born 10 November 1952) is a British ice dancer. She competed in the ice dance event at the 1976 Winter Olympics.

References

External links
 

1952 births
Living people
British female ice dancers
Olympic figure skaters of Great Britain
Figure skaters at the 1976 Winter Olympics
Sportspeople from London